Mark Brusasco (born 24 August 1960) is an Australian former association football player.

Early life and education
He is the son of Ian Brusasco AO a former Brisbane city councilor and later president of Soccer Australia (now Football Federation Australia). Between 1973 and 1977 Brusasco attended Brisbane Grammar School.

Schoolboy rugby
Brusasco represented Queensland Schoolboys in rugby union.

Soccer career

Club career
Brusasco played in the National Soccer League for Brisbane City.

International career
Brusasco made one full international appearance as a substitute in Australia's defeat of Papua New Guinea in the 1980 OFC Nations Cup.

References

1960 births
Living people
Soccer players from Melbourne
Australian soccer players
Brisbane City FC players
National Soccer League (Australia) players
1980 Oceania Cup players
Australia international soccer players
Association football forwards
Australian people of Italian descent